Benthochromis is a small genus of planktivorous cichlid fish that are endemic to relatively deep waters in Lake Tanganyika in Africa.

Species
There are currently three recognized species in this genus:

 Benthochromis horii T. Takahashi, 2008
 Benthochromis melanoides (Poll, 1984)
 Benthochromis tricoti (Poll, 1948)

References

 

Fish of Africa
Cichlid genera
Taxa named by Max Poll